Noda is a Japanese surname. Notable people with the surname include:

, Japanese football player
, Japanese footballer
Alice Sae Teshima Noda (1894–1964), American businesswoman
, New Zealand sailor and farmer
, Japanese footballer
, Japanese racing driver
, Japanese actor, playwright and theatre director
, American artist
, Japanese footballer
Isao Noda (born 1951), Japanese chemical engineer
, Japanese voice actress
, Japanese swimmer
, Japanese voice actor
Ken Noda, American classical pianist
, Japanese handball player
, Japanese screenwriter
, Japanese footballer
, Japanese baseball player
, Japanese footballer
Mitsuzo Noda (1909–1995), phycologist with the standard author abbreviation "Noda"
, Japanese artist
, Japanese business scholar
, Japanese trade unionist and politician
Ryan Noda (born 1996), American baseball player
, Japanese composer and musician
, Japanese footballer
, Japanese manga artist
, Japanese footballer
, Japanese politician
Steere Noda (1892–1986), American politician, lawyer and baseball player
, Japanese politician
, Japanese footballer
, Japanese freestyle skier
, Japanese artist, printmaker and educator
, Japanese racewalker
, Japanese businessman and politician
, Japanese singer, songwriter, record producer and actor
, Japanese politician and Prime Minister of Japan
, Japanese swimmer

Japanese-language surnames